Satevó  is one of the 67 municipalities of Chihuahua, in northern Mexico. The municipal seat lies at San Francisco Javier de Satevó. The municipality covers an area of 2,185.1 km².

As of 2010, the municipality had a total population of 3,662, down from 3,856 as of 2005.

The municipality had 244 localities, none of which had a population over 1,000.

Satevó began as a Jesuit mission to the Tarahumara in about 1640.

Geography

Towns and villages
The municipality has 126 localities. The largest are:

References

Municipalities of Chihuahua (state)